The Quiet Man is a 1952 American romantic comedy-drama film directed by John Ford. It stars John Wayne, Maureen O'Hara, Barry Fitzgerald, Ward Bond and Victor McLaglen. The screenplay by Frank S. Nugent was based on a 1933 Saturday Evening Post short story of the same name by Maurice Walsh, later published as part of a collection titled The Green Rushes. The film features Winton Hoch's lush photography of the Irish countryside and a long, climactic, semi-comic fist fight. It was an official selection of the 1952 Venice Film Festival.

John Ford won the Academy Award for Best Director, his fourth, and Winton Hoch won for Best Cinematography. In 2013, the film was selected for preservation in the United States National Film Registry by the Library of Congress as being "culturally, historically, or aesthetically significant".

Plot

In the 1920s, Sean "Trooper Thorn" Thornton, an Irish-born retired boxer, travels from Pittsburgh to his birthplace of Inisfree to purchase the old family farm. Shortly after arriving, he meets and falls in love with fiery, red-headed Mary Kate Danaher, the sister of bullying Squire "Red" Will Danaher. Will also wants to buy the old Thornton property, and is angered when the current owner, the wealthy Widow Tillane, accepts Sean's bid instead of his. Will then retaliates by refusing consent for Sean to marry his sister.

Some village residents, including Father Peter Lonergan and local matchmaker-cum-bookmaker Michaeleen Óge Flynn,  trick Will Danaher into believing that Widow Tillane will marry him if Mary Kate is no longer under his roof. He gleefully allows the marriage, but is furious upon discovering the deceit and refuses to give Mary Kate her dowry. Sean, unschooled in Irish customs, professes no interest in the dowry; but to Mary Kate, the dowry is a matter of pride and represents her personal value within the community and her independence. She insists the dowry must be received to validate their marriage, causing her and Sean to become estranged. The villagers eventually persuade Will to release Mary Kate's furniture, but Will withholds the monetary portion of the dowry.

Mary Kate believes Sean is a coward for not fighting Will. Sean goes to the local Protestant minister and fellow former boxer, the Rev. Cyril Playfair. Sean reveals he gave up boxing after accidentally killing a younger, married opponent in the ring. Mary Kate also confesses (in Irish Gaelic) her part in the quarrel to Father Lonergan, who berates her for being selfish. Mary Kate and Sean partially reconcile and share the bedroom for the first time since their marriage.

However, early the next morning, Mary Kate leaves the cottage and boards a train for Dublin, hoping the pretense of leaving will spur Sean to action. Sean soon learns from Michaeleen where she is and races on horseback to the train station where he pulls her off the train. There, Sean confronts Will and demands the dower-money. When Will refuses, Sean throws Mary Kate back at her brother, declaring he will abide by the Irish custom of "no fortune, no marriage". The ultimatum shocks both Mary Kate and Will, who finally pays the £350 (over £17,000 in 2022). Sean immediately burns it in the boiler, abetted by Mary Kate, who proves it was about her pride and not money. She proudly leaves for home, but a humiliated Will takes a swing at Sean, only to be knocked down by Sean's defensive counter-punch.

A donnybrook ensues, then evolves into a long Homeric fistfight between Sean and Will after they insincerely agree to adhere to the Marquess of Queensberry rules. This much-anticipated match attracts more and more spectators as it continues for miles across the landscape. The fighters finally pause for a drink inside Cohan's Bar, where they begrudgingly admit a mutual respect for one another. As they argue over who will pay for the drinks, Will tosses a brew into Sean's face. Sean punches Will, sending him crashing through the bar doors to lie unconscious in the street, ending the fight. Later, the reconciled and inebriated brothers-in-law stagger arm-in-arm back to Sean and Mary Kate's home for supper, much to Mary Kate's amusement and delight.

The next day, a humbled Will and the Widow Tillane begin their own chaperoned courtship, riding side by side in a horse-drawn jaunting car driven by Michaeleen. Sean, Mary Kate, and the villagers wave to them as they pass, before Sean and Mary Kate playfully run back to the cottage.

Cast

Production
The film was something of a departure for Wayne and Ford, who were both known mostly for Westerns and other action-oriented films. It was also a departure for Republic Pictures, which backed Ford in what was considered a risky venture at the time. It was the only time the studio, known for low budget B-movies, released a film that would receive an Oscar nomination for Best Picture.

Ford read the story in 1933 and soon purchased the rights to it for $10. The story's author was paid another $2,500 when Republic bought the idea, and he received a final payment of $3,750 when the film was actually made. Republic Pictures agreed to finance the film with O'Hara and Wayne starring and Ford directing, but only if all three agreed to first film a Western with Republic. They did, and after completing Rio Grande, they headed for Ireland to start shooting.

One of the conditions that Republic placed on Ford was that the film run under two hours. However, the finished picture was two hours and nine minutes. When screening the film for Republic executives, Ford stopped the film at approximately two hours in, on the verge of the climactic fistfight. Republic executives relented and allowed the film to run its full length. It was one of the few films that Republic filmed in Technicolor; most of the studio's other color films were made in a more economical process known as Trucolor.

The film employed many actors from the Irish theatre, including Barry Fitzgerald's brother, Arthur Shields, as well as extras from the Irish countryside, and it is one of the few Hollywood movies in which the Irish language can be heard. Filming commenced on June 7, 1951. All of the outdoor scenes were shot on location in Ireland in County Mayo and County Galway. The inside scenes were filmed toward the end of July at the Republic Studios in Hollywood. Vawn Corrigan reports that Ford made considerable efforts to get the costumes correct for the period with Ó’Maille – The Original House of Style in Galway tasked with sourcing the costumes.

The story is set in the fictional community of Inisfree. This is not the same as the Lake Isle of Innisfree, a place in Lough Gill on the Sligo–Leitrim border made famous by poet William Butler Yeats, which is a tiny island. Many scenes for the film were actually shot in and around the village of Cong, County Mayo, on the grounds of Cong's Ashford Castle. Cong is now a wealthy small town and the castle a 5-star luxury hotel. The connections with the film have led to the area becoming a tourist attraction. In 2008, a pub opened in the building used as the pub in the film (it had actually been a shop at the time when the movie was shot); the pub hosts daily re-runs of the film on DVD. The Quiet Man Fan Club holds its annual general meeting in Ashford Castle. Other locations in the film include Thoor Ballylee, Co. Galway, home of poet W.B. Yeats for a period, Ballyglunin railway station near Tuam Co. Galway, which was filmed as Castletown station, and various places in Connemara Co. Galway and Co. Mayo. Among those are Lettergesh beach, where the horse race scene was filmed, "The Quiet Man Bridge", signposted off the N59 road between Maam Cross and Oughterard and the "White O'Morn" cottage. The latter is located on R336 south of Maam, but long ago fell into ruin.

The film also presents Ford's depiction of an idealized Irish society, with only implied social divisions based on class and differences in political or religious affiliations. The Catholic priest, Father Lonergan, and the Protestant minister, Reverend Playfair, maintain a strong friendly relationship throughout the film, which represented the norm in what was then the Irish Free State, where religious tensions occurred in the 1930s but were the norm only in Northern Ireland. One of the allusions to Anglo-Irish animosity occurs after the happy couple is married and a congratulatory toast offered by Hugh Forbes expresses the wish that they live in "national freedom" (the term national has been censored from most editions) and before the final donnybrook when Thornton demands his wife's dowry from Danaher. Danaher asks Hugh Forbes, who had been commander of the local Irish Republican Army unit during the fight to expel the British, "So the IRA is in this too, ah", to which Forbes replies, "If it were, not a scorched stone of your fine house would be standing."

Ernie O'Malley, an Irish Republican Army officer during the war of independence, commander of the anti-Treaty IRA during the Irish Civil War, and author, acted as an advisor to Ford on the local culture, being on set with him every day. According to O'Hara, Ford "had a great deal of respect for Ernie...He had such respect for Ernie. They would natter away like old buddies...They liked each other. They were friends".

Music
Ford chose his friend, Hollywood composer Victor Young, to compose the score for the film. Young sprinkled the soundtrack with many Irish airs such as the "Rakes of Mallow" and "The Wild Colonial Boy". One piece of music, chosen by Ford himself, is most prominent: the melody the "Isle of Innisfree", written not by Young, but by the Irish policeman/songwriter Richard Farrelly. The melody of the "Isle of Innisfree", which is first heard over the opening credit sequence with Ashford Castle in the background, becomes the principal musical theme of The Quiet Man. The melody is reprised at least eleven times throughout the film.

The upbeat melody comically hummed by Michaeleen Oge Flynn and later played on the accordion is the "Rakes of Mallow".

A portion of the Irish version of "The Wild Colonial Boy" is played throughout the film.

When Maureen O'Hara died in October 2015, her family stated she listened to music from The Quiet Man during her final hours. Filmmaker George A. Romero was also said to have died listening to the score.

Reception
In 1952 A. H. Weiler of The New York Times viewed the film "as darlin' a picture as we've seen this year," with "dialogue that is as tuneful as a lark's song." In another contemporary review, the entertainment trade paper Variety called the picture "beautifully filmed" and wrote that "Wayne works well under Ford's direction," but found the 129-minute running time "unnecessary." Harrison's Reports described the film as "a delightful and rollicking comedy melodrama of Irish life, directed with skill and acted with gusto by a fine cast." Richard L. Coe of The Washington Post declared it "a complete jim-dandy ... The photography is glorious and Victor Young's score, inspired by folk airs, is a complete joy for an exuberant, vigorous picture." Philip Hamburger of The New Yorker was not so taken with the film, writing, "If am to believe what I saw in John Ford's sentimental new film, 'The Quiet Man,' practically everybody in Ireland is just as cute as a button," adding, "Mr. Ford's scenes of the Irish countryside are often breathtaking ... but the master who made 'The Informer' appears to have fallen into a vat of treacle." In contrast to contemporary reviews of the film, editorial writer Frances Mulraney saw the film as "misogynistic" and "outdated"—due not just to the psychological and physical control the male characters exert over the female characters, but also for the female lead's gender-based expectations of her husband.

On the review-aggregation website Rotten Tomatoes, The Quiet Man in 2019 has a 90% approval rating based on reviews from 41 critics. Critical consensus on the website states, "Director John Ford and star John Wayne depart the Western for the Irish countryside, and the result is a beautifully photographed, often comedic romance."

The film was also a financial success, grossing $3.8 million in its first year of release. This was among the top ten grosses of the year. It was also the seventh most popular film for British audiences in 1952.

Awards and nominations

Home video
It was first released on DVD December 14, 1998 by Artisan Home Entertainment. It was also released 4 years later on a Collector's edition DVD on October 22, 2002 by Artisan. The Special features on this edition include "The Making of the Quiet Man" Documentary with Leonard Maltin, and "The Joy of Ireland" Documentary with Maureen O'Hara and Andrew V. McLaglen, and "Remembering The Quiet Man Montage".

On January 22, 2013 Olive Films released The Quiet Man on DVD and for the first time on Blu-ray, as a 60th Anniversary Special edition. It included the documentary "The Making of the Quiet Man" with Leonard Maltin.

In 2010 there was a documentary called Dreaming The Quiet Man made about the journey and making of The Quiet Man. It was narrated by Gabriel Byrne, and had interviews with Peter Bogdanovich, Martin Scorsese, Charles F. Fitzsimons, and Maureen O'Hara. It was released on DVD and Blu-ray for the first time on March 24, 2015.

In popular culture
The scene where John Wayne kisses Maureen O'Hara during a storm appears on a television set in a scene of the 1982 Steven Spielberg film, E.T. the Extra-Terrestrial.

See also
 John Wayne filmography
 Marquess of Queensberry rules of boxing
 Donnybrook!, a 1961 musical adaptation of The Quiet Man written by Johnny Burke
 Innisfree, a 1990 Spanish documentary film about the making of The Quiet Man
 Jaunting car, the horse-drawn vehicle owned by Michaeleen Oge Flynn that is first seen delivering Sean to Innisfree at the beginning of the film. Michaleen is seen using it throughout the film as his main mode of transport and it is in the amusing courting scenes that it plays a greater role.

Gallery

Notes

References

Sources
 Crosson, Seán and Rod Stoneman (2009). The Quiet Man ... and Beyond: Reflections on a Classic Film, John Ford, and Ireland. Liffey Press. . Includes chapters examining the film's use of language, style, landscape and Ford's connection more generally with Ireland.
  Includes a chapter on the film's score and the "Isle of Innisfree".
  Narrative of the film's production.

External links

 
 
 
 
 The Quiet Man on Rotten Tomatoes
 The Quiet Man at Filmsite.org
 Quiet Man Movie Club
 The Quiet Man at Reel Classics
 The Quiet Man Cottage museum in Cong
 William C. Dowling, "John Ford's Festive Comedy: Ireland Imagined in The Quiet Man"
 Dick Farrelly, songwriter: Lyrics
 A Quiet Man Miscellany Cork University Press
 Dick Farrelly and 'The Isle of Innisfree'
 The Quiet Man essay by Scott Allen Nollen at National Film Registry

1952 films
1950s romantic comedy-drama films
American romantic comedy-drama films
American boxing films
English-language Irish films
Films scored by Victor Young
Films about weddings
Films based on short fiction
Films directed by John Ford
Films set in the 1920s
Films set in Ireland
Films shot in the Republic of Ireland
Films whose director won the Best Directing Academy Award
Films whose cinematographer won the Best Cinematography Academy Award
Irish-American mass media
Irish-American culture
Irish-language films
Republic Pictures films
United States National Film Registry films
1952 drama films
1950s English-language films
1950s American films